Janine Marie Raymundo Tugonon (born October 19, 1989) is a Filipino model, TV presenter, actress and beauty pageant titleholder who was crowned Miss Universe Philippines 2012. She represented the Philippines at the Miss Universe 2012 pageant and placed 1st Runner-Up.

Early life and education
Janine Mari Raymundo Tugonon was born and raised in Balanga, Bataan, Philippines. She finished her pharmacy degree with Latin honours (cum laude) at the University of Santo Tomas in Manila, and became a licensed pharmacist in June 2010.

Pageantry

Binibining Pilipinas 2011

In 2011, Tugonon placed 1st Runner-Up in the Binibining Pilipinas 2011 pageant. The eventual winner was Shamcey Supsup.

Binibining Pilipinas 2012

In 2012, Janine once again joined the 49th edition of the Binibining Pilipinas pageant. During the question and answer round, she was asked: "Many women nowadays forego a happy family life for a successful career. How do you feel about this?" She responded:
"I believe that women have the right to choose between what they want. But for me, just go for what God wants you to do. Between the two, whatever it is, you must do what's your purpose in this world. Just have a child-like faith and mature obedience, and everything will go smooth."

At the end of the event, she won the title of Miss Universe Philippines 2012, gaining the right to represent the Philippines at the Miss Universe 2012 pageant.

On April 14, 2013, Tugonon crowned Ariella Arida as her successor at the Binibining Pilipinas 2013 pageant held at the Smart Araneta Coliseum in Quezon City, Philippines.

Miss Universe 2012

On 19 December 2012, Tugonon competed in Miss Universe 2012 at the Planet Hollywood Resort and Casino in Las Vegas, United States where she finished 1st Runner-Up to Olivia Culpo of the USA.  Tugonon was the only Asian to place in the Top 5. Philippines placed in the Top 5 for the third consecutive year.

During the final question and answer portion of the competition Tugonon was asked a question via Twitter and read by judge Nigel Barker: "As an international ambassador, do you believe that speaking English should be a prerequisite to being Miss Universe? Why or why not?" Tugonon replied:
"For me, being Miss Universe is not just about knowing how to speak a specific language – it is being able to influence and inspire other people. So whatever language you have, as long your heart is to serve and you have a strong mind to show to people, then, you can be Miss Universe."

Tugonon is the second Filipina to place 1st Runner-Up, after Miriam Quiambao at Miss Universe 1999.

Modeling career

2012–2016: After Miss Universe 2012 and modeling career
After pageant, she graced to cover various Philippine-based magazines such as Preview, Metro, and FilJap Magazine, which eventually made it in international fashion industry. Tugonon is now living in the United States as she pursue her studies. She walked multiple fashion shows across America. Two of her biggest endorsements are Wells Fargo and Walmart. Her latest stint was on the newest commercial of Victoria's Secret Pink.

Personal life
Tugonon's relationship with Jaypee Santos was put in the spotlight. The two broke up in March 2013. Tugonon, together with Santos, appeared in ABS-CBN's "KrisTV" in April 2013 where she admitted to being a huge fan of Irish rock band The Script, as well as her break-up with Santos due to her regular communication with Danny O'Donoghue, The Script’s lead singer & keyboardist, after host Kris Aquino publicly embarrassed Santos in front of the camera. However, Tugonon stated that she did not have a relationship with the singer and that the break-up was only for the purpose of "thinking things over". Nevertheless, Tugonon received a lot of criticisms from netizens over her actions towards Santos on national television.

References

External links

Complete Profile of Janine Tugonon
Fast facts about Bb. Pilipinas 2012 Janine Tugonon

Living people
Filipino female models
People from Bataan
Binibining Pilipinas winners
Miss Universe 2012 contestants
Star Magic
University of Santo Tomas alumni
1989 births